Chatia College is an institution for higher education located in Sootea in Naduar area under Biswanath district of Assam, India. The college was established in 1982.

Geography 

Chatia College is a premier institute of higher learning in Sootea, Assam. It was established in 1982. The college has Arunachal Pradesh to the north, the Brahmaputra river to the south, the Ghiladhari river to the east, and the Dekorai river to the west. About 72 villages comprise the areas immediately surrounding the college. The serene and eco-friendly campus adds to the beauty of this institution.

Courses 

The college offers the following courses: three-year degree courses in arts  stream under Gauhati University of Assam, India.
The college is also a centre of distance education to the Krishna Kanta Handiqui State Open University (KKHSOU) and the institute of Distance and Open Learning (IDOL) of the Gauhati University.

Departments 

Assamese
Nepali
Bodo
English
History
Education
Economics
Political Science
Sanskrit

See also 
Jamugurihat
Sootea
Biswanath district
Tyagbir Hem Baruah College

References 

Educational institute in Jamugurihat
Universities and colleges in Assam
Educational institutions established in 1982
Biswanath district
1982 establishments in Assam
Colleges affiliated to Gauhati University